Lake Arrowhead is an unincorporated community and a census-designated place (CDP) in the San Bernardino Mountains of San Bernardino County, California, surrounded by the San Bernardino National Forest, and surrounding the eponymous Lake Arrowhead Reservoir. Lake Arrowhead is located 13 miles north east of the San Bernardino city limits. The population of the CDP was estimated at 12,424 in the 2010 census. It was formerly called "Little Bear Lake", until around 1920, when a group from Los Angeles, the Arrowhead Lake Company, bought the lake and the land surrounding it, and changed its name to Arrowhead Lake.

Tourism is the primary economic generator for the area, contributing several million dollars per year to the county and providing hundreds of full-time and part-time jobs for local residents. The area is host to over 4 million visitors a year. There are 400 guest rooms in hotels, motels and bed and breakfasts, vacation cabin rentals, condos, and rustic cabin lodges and resorts.  The Lake Arrowhead community is home to the Lake Arrowhead Country Club and Golf Course, Lake Arrowhead Yacht Club, and SkyPark at Santa's Village. The area is also popular for business conferences.

Economy

As a scenic mountain resort in the San Bernardino Mountains, Lake Arrowhead's economy is almost completely supported by tourism, both by casual vacationers and part-time residents. The primary tourism industries include real estate, lodging, dining, recreation, and retail sales.

While Lake Arrowhead has no official town center, the Lake Arrowhead Village serves as the main commercial area for both locals and tourists and includes a number of factory outlets, boutiques, restaurants, two banks, a post office and a supermarket.  One author visiting in 1978 described it as a "clean, Swiss-like community with many chalets." Lake Arrowhead Village also hosts events all year long including a free Summer Concert Series, the county's largest free Oktoberfest and many other themed events such as car shows, dog shows, the Tour de Lake Arrowhead, Home Expo, and the popular Antique Wooden Boat Show.

The University of California, Los Angeles operates the nearby UCLA Conference Center, a full-service conference facility with lodging and meeting space. Other major employers include Mountains Community Hospital, Rim of the World Unified School District, and Above It All Treatment Center.

Logging in the San Bernardino Mountains was once done on a large scale, with the Brookings Lumber Company operation one of the largest. It built a logging railroad to bring logs to the mill at Fredalba. The Shay locomotives had to be disassembled and hauled by wagon up the mountain, since the railroad operated in the high country but did not connect to other railroads in lowlands. Finished lumber was hauled by wagon down the steep grades to the Molino Box Factory in Highland, California.

Geography

Lake Arrowhead is located in the Inland Empire region of Southern California, about 20 minutes north of the San Bernardino city limits. Its economic center is at the intersection of State Routes 173 and 189. The CDP has a total area of 19.0 square miles (49.1 km), of which 17.7 square miles (45.9 km) is land and 1.2 square miles (3.2 km; 6.46%) is water.

Lake Arrowhead is a private lake governed by the Arrowhead Lake Association and is for restricted use by Lake Arrowhead property owners.

 Lake size:  (capacity)
 Shoreline: 
 Elevation: 5106.70 (capacity)
 Maximum depth: 
 Lake width: 
 Lake length: 

Outside of Lake Arrowhead Village there are several residential communities, which include Cedar Glen, Blue Jay, Rimforest, Skyforest, Twin Peaks, Crest Park, Hook Creek Tract, Deer Lodge Park, Arrowhead Villas, Grass Valley, and Agua Fria.  There are three elementary schools, one middle school, and one high school in the area.   north of Lake Arrowhead is the Pacific Crest Trail.

Santa's Village at Lake Arrowhead was a popular theme park from 1955 to 1998, and reopened in 2016. It was the first franchised one in the United States, with two others in the Santa Cruz Mountains and Illinois.

Demographics

2010
At the 2010 census Lake Arrowhead had a population of 12,424. The racial makeup of Lake Arrowhead was 10,729 (86.4%) White (73.0% Non-Hispanic White), 95 (0.8%) African American, 93 (0.7%) Native American, 152 (1.2%) Asian, 33 (0.3%) Pacific Islander, 847 (6.8%) from other races, and 475 (3.8%) from two or more races. Hispanic or Latino of any race were 2,709 persons (21.8%).

The census reported that 12,389 people (99.7% of the population) lived in households, 16 (0.1%) lived in non-institutionalized group quarters, and 19 (0.2%) were institutionalized.

There were 4,672 households, 1,563 (33.5%) had children under the age of 18 living in them, 2,746 (58.8%) were opposite-sex married couples living together, 413 (8.8%) had a female householder with no husband present, 258 (5.5%) had a male householder with no wife present.  There were 217 (4.6%) unmarried opposite-sex partnerships, and 64 (1.4%) same-sex married couples or partnerships. 984 households (21.1%) were one person and 358 (7.7%) had someone living alone who was 65 or older. The average household size was 2.65.  There were 3,417 families (73.1% of households); the average family size was 3.07.

The age distribution was 3,043 people (24.5%) under the age of 18, 968 people (7.8%) aged 18 to 24, 2,571 people (20.7%) aged 25 to 44, 4,104 people (33.0%) aged 45 to 64, and 1,738 people (14.0%) who were 65 or older.  The median age was 43.0 years. For every 100 females, there were 103.8 males.  For every 100 females age 18 and over, there were 103.4 males.

There were 11,875 housing units at an average density of 626.6 per square mile, of the occupied units 3,428 (73.4%) were owner-occupied and 1,244 (26.6%) were rented. The homeowner vacancy rate was 7.9%; the rental vacancy rate was 12.4%.  8,647 people (69.6% of the population) lived in owner-occupied housing units and 3,742 people (30.1%) lived in rental housing units.

According to the 2010 United States Census, Lake Arrowhead had a median household income of $57,672, with 11.2% of the population living below the federal poverty line.

2000
At the 2000 census there were 8,934 people in 3,243 households, including 2,445 families, in the CDP. The population density was 780.4 inhabitants per square mile (301.3/km). The racial makeup of the CDP was 90.5% White, 0.6% African American, 0.9% Native American, 1.0% Asian, 0.1% Pacific Islander, 3.9% from other races, and 3.1% from two or more races. Hispanic or Latino of any race were 13.6%.

There were 3,243 households, of which 37.3% had children under the age of 18 living with them, 62.6% were married couples living together, 8.9% had a female householder with no husband present, and 24.6% were non-families. Of all households 18.7% were one person and 6.0% were one person aged 65 or older.  The average household size was 2.8 and the average family size was 3.2.

The age distribution was 28.9% under the age of 18, 6.5% from 18 to 24, 24.5% from 25 to 44, 28.8% from 45 to 64, and 11.2% 65 or older.  The median age was 39 years. For every 100 females, there were 100.8 males.  For every 100 females age 18 and over, there were 100.0 males.

The median household income was $60,826 and the median family income was $65,183. Males had a median income of $50,016 versus $35,526 for females. The per capita income for the CDP was $28,176.  About 7.3% of families and 9.1% of the population were below the poverty line, including 10.5% of those under age 18 and 6.2% of those age 65 or over.

Government

In the Senate, California is represented by Alex Padilla (D) and Dianne Feinstein (D).

Climate
The Lake Arrowhead Community has a unique climate for Southern California with four distinct seasons which support an array of outdoor recreational activity and year-round beauty. Lake Arrowhead has a Warm-summer Mediterranean climate (Köppen climate classification Csb). During the summer, warm temperatures and monsoon thunderstorms are common. During the winter months, large pacific storms bring plenty of snow. The area receives about 300 annual days of sunshine per year. Beginning in late 2011, a catastrophic drought began affecting Lake Arrowhead along with the rest of California. By November 2016, the lake level dropped . This drop exposed much of the lake floor and beached most of the docks.

Inclement weather
Heavy snow and winds have caused major power outages in the area. A storm in the last week of December 2021 left many homes without power for a week. Similarly on Thanksgiving weekend 2019, homes were without power for up to four days.

In popular culture
Lake Arrowhead has appeared in a variety of movies, including The Squaw Man (1914), The High Land (1926), The Wolf Dog (1933), Fighting Trooper (1934), Down in 'Arkansaw' (1938), Spawn of the North (1938), North of the Yukon (1939), Comin' Round The Mountain (1940), Untamed (1940), The Royal Mounted Patrol (1941), Wild Geese Calling (1941), North of the Rockies (1942), Can't Help Singing (1943), The Yearling (1946), Sand (1949), The Parent Trap (1961), Seven Days in May (1964) The Great Race (1965), Heidi (1937) and Of Human Hearts (1938).

Of special note, the exterior shots for the movie Sunrise: A Song of Two Humans (1927) were filmed here featuring actors George O'Brien, Janet Gaynor, and Margaret Livingston and directed by F. W. Murnau, a German director who was one of the leading figures in German Expressionism.  The film won three Academy Awards for  Best Actress in a Leading Role, Best Cinematography, and Academy Award for Unique and Artistic Picture at the first Academy Awards ceremony in 1929.

Arts and sciences
The Lake Arrowhead Communities have numerous cultural events and organizations. The Arrowhead Arts Association is a non-profit corporation dedicated to cultural enrichment sponsoring quality musical performances and providing musical education and scholarships for local youth from preschool through college. The Mountain Skies Astronomical Society is also located there.

Architecture 

These homes and estates were designed by some of the most significant architects practicing in Southern California at the time. These architects included:

John Byers
Roland Coate
Robert Farquhar
Gordon Kaufman
Marston, Van Pelt & Maybury
Morgan, Walls & Clements
Lutah Marie Riggs
Lloyd Wright (Frank Lloyd Wright's son)
Rudolf Schnidler
McNeal Swasey
Paul Revere Williams
William Woollett

In the early years of development, the architectural committee of the resort community mandated that homes be built in the French Norman  or English Tudor Style. Rudolf Schindler, a modernist architect, designed what is known as the first modern A-frame house in 1936 for Gisela Bennati, as his interpretation of French Norman style architecture. The first known sketches for the Bennati Cabin date from 1934. Schindler did sketches for "triangle-based house designs" as early as 1922, but none of those designs were built. Lake Arrowhead is also home to what has been sometimes referred to as the world’s largest A-frame structure, the clubhouse of the Lake Arrowhead Country Club.

The following is a list of people who have owned or built homes in Lake Arrowhead: John O'Melveny, J.B. Van Nuys (one of the developers of Lake Arrowhead and son of Isaac Newton Van Nuys, founder of Van Nuys, CA), Rhoda Rindge & Merritt Adamson (founders of Malibu, CA), John Northrop, Katherine Iten (Iten Biscuit Company/NABISCO), Edward L. Doheny, Jules Stein, Conrad "Nicky" Hilton, Jr., Dan Dureya, Max Factor, Thomas F. Hamilton, Prince Massianoff, Leo McCarey, Charlie Chaplin, Myrna Loy, Ruth Hussey, Shirley Temple, Lon Chaney, Doris Day, June Lockhart, Walter Huston, Robert Taylor, Loretta Young, Liberace, Brian Wilson, Priscilla Presley and Frankie Avalon to name a few.

References

External links

Lake Arrowhead Communities Chamber of Commerce

San Bernardino Mountains
Census-designated places in San Bernardino County, California
Census-designated places in California
Articles containing video clips